Erich Haagensen Jaabech (6 December 1761 – 4 January 1845)  was a Norwegian farmer who served as a representative at the Norwegian Constitutional Assembly.

Jaabech was born on Usland at Øyslebø in Vest-Agder, Norway. He was the son of Haagen Olson Usland (1721-1773) and Marte Eriksdtr. Skjævesland (1731-1790). In 1788, he married Gunhild Olsdtr. Skjævesland (1763-1844) with whom he had eight children.

He was a farmer who also worked as a teacher in Øyslebø and Holum. In 1806, he bought the farm Jaabekk in Halse parish (Jåbekk gård i Halse ved Mandal) and established residence at that farm. He was also active as a trader, blacksmith and cooper.

He was elected to the Norwegian Constituent Assembly in 1814, representing the constituency of Mandals Amt (now Vest-Agder) together with    Osmund Andersen Lømsland and Syvert Omundsen Eeg. At the Assembly, all three supported the union party (unionspartiet).

References

External links
Representantene på Eidsvoll 1814 (Cappelen Damm AS)
 Men of Eidsvoll (eidsvollsmenn)

1761 births
1845 deaths
Fathers of the Constitution of Norway
Vest-Agder politicians